Hans Christian Harald Tegner, known as Hans Tegner (30 November 1853 – 2 April 1932), was a Danish artist and illustrator. He is primarily known for his illustrations of literary works by Hans Christian Andersen and Ludvig Holberg and for his work for the Bing & Grøndahl porcelain factory.

Early life and education
Son of lithographer Isac Wilhelm Tegner, Hans studied at the Royal Danish Academy of Fine Arts from 1869 to 1878.

Career
His first art exhibition was in 1882, featuring watercolour illustrations of Hans Christian Andersen's story The Tinderbox. His second, and last, exhibition in 1889 was a watercolour painting celebrating the 50-year jubilee of the Constitution of Denmark, and was bought by king Christian IX of Denmark. From 1883 to 1888, Tegner painted a series of illustrations for the works of Ludvig Holberg, his greatest artistic accomplishment. The second great accomplishment of Tegner, was his exquisite illustrations produced for the so-called international selection of Andersen's fairy tales, finished in 1901.

Tegner was made professor at the Royal Danish Academy of Fine Arts in 1897. He illustrated a number of other books, as well as postal stamps, and the first 5-Danish krone note in 1898. He was the leader of Kunsthåndværkerskolen (a part of what is now Danmarks Designskole) from 1901 to 1917, and chief designer at porcelain manufacturer Bing & Grøndahl from 1907 to 1932. He died on 2 April 1932 in Fredensborg.

Personal life

Tegner married Helga Byberg (13 January 1862 - 26 February 1945), a daughter of merchant Ole Strib Hansen Byberg (1812–82) and Karen Møller (1821–89), on 24 November 1896 in Sundby.

He died on 2 April 1932 and is buried in Asminderød Cemetery

References

External links

1853 births
1932 deaths
Danish artists
Academic staff of the Royal Danish Academy of Fine Arts
Royal Danish Academy of Fine Arts alumni
19th-century illustrators of fairy tales
20th-century illustrators of fairy tales